Khamis is a village located between Salmaniya and Isa town in the Kingdom of Bahrain. It is largely a residential area with a number of shops and business establishments.

It is also the site of the Khamis Mosque, which is the first Islamic mosque in Bahrain.  It used to be host to a weekly souq every Thursday.

See also
 Khamis Mosque
 Manama
 Bahrain

References

Populated places in the Northern Governorate, Bahrain